Choong Hon Jian (Pha̍k-fa-sṳ: Chûng Fùng-khien, born 2 July 2000) is a Malaysian badminton player. He won a bronze medal at the 2018 Badminton Asia Junior Championships in the mixed team event.

Career 
In 2021, Choong won his first international title with his partner Toh Ee Wei at the Polish Open. The two would go onto win another 2 consecutive titles at the Slovenian International and the Austrian Open. In 2023, he began partnering with Goh Sze Fei in men's doubles event at the Thailand International Challenge.

Achievements

BWF International Challenge/Series (3 titles, 2 runners-up) 
Men's doubles

Mixed doubles

  BWF International Challenge tournament
  BWF International Series tournament

References

External links 

2000 births
Living people
Malaysian sportspeople of Chinese descent
Malaysian male badminton players
21st-century Malaysian people